This article lists American films released to theatres in 2006.

Box office 
The highest-grossing American films released in 2006, by domestic box office gross revenue, are as follows:

January–March

April–June

July–September

October–December

See also
 2006 in American television
 2006 in the United States

External links

 
 List of 2006 box office number-one films in the United States

References

Films
Lists of 2006 films by country or language
2006